Jules Dugal (1888–1976) was a head coach of the Montreal Canadiens, following Cecil Hart.  He managed the team for half of one year, 1939.  His record that one year was 9-6-3.  The Canadiens made it to the playoffs, but lost in the first round to the Detroit Red Wings, 2 games to 1.

Before becoming head coach Dugal was the team's secretary treasurer from 1922 to 1939 and then briefly as general manager from 1939 to 1940.

Personal

Dugal was born Saint-Jean-de-l'Île-d'Orléans, Quebec, in 1888 and later studied at Collège de Lévis.

Dugal died January 24, 1976, at Pompano Beach, Florida.

Coaching record

References

Notes

Canadian ice hockey coaches
Montreal Canadiens coaches
Montreal Canadiens executives
1888 births
1975 deaths